The 2019 London 9s will be the second staging of the London 9s tournament and will take place at East London RFC on the 25 August 2019.

Teams

Men's Open
Africa United 
Edinburgh Eagles 
Red Star Belgrade RLFC 
Roots Rugby 
Welsh Mighty Ducks 
West Africa /

Men's Social
Bangor Buffaloes 
Bath Rugby League 
Boston Buccaneers 
Lietuva Rugby League 
London Skolars Under 20s 
Manchester Rangers 
Newham Dockers

Women's tournament
Barnes Bears 
East London Vixens 
Foxy Ladies 
Roots Rugby 
Royal Air Force 
Royal Navy

Media coverage
Sportsflick

References

2019 in English rugby league
International rugby league competitions hosted by the United Kingdom
Rugby league nines